Kalkni (Dargwa: Кьялкни) is a rural locality (a selo) in Dakhadayevsky District, Republic of Dagestan, Russia. The population was 1,317 as of 2010.

Geography
Kalkni is located 12 km northeast of Urkarakh (the district's administrative centre) by road. Gunakari and Dibgashi are the nearest rural localities.

Nationalities 
Dargins live there.

References 

Rural localities in Dakhadayevsky District